Abíeta (Ancient Greek: Ἀβίητα) was an ancient city mentioned by Ptolemy. It was located between the Middle Danube and the Tisza River, in what was considered the territory of Metanasian Iazyges.

References 

History of Europe